Grypocoris is a genus of true bugs belonging to the family Miridae or plant bugs, subfamily Mirinae.

Species
 Grypocoris melanopygus 
 Grypocoris sexguttatus  
 Grypocoris stysi

References

Miridae genera
Mirini